Phenoxyethanol is the organic compound with the formula C6H5OC2H4OH.  It is a colorless oily liquid. It can be classified as a glycol ether and a phenol ether. It is a common preservative in vaccine formulations.

Use 

Phenoxyethanol has germicidal and germistatic properties. It is often used together with quaternary ammonium compounds.

Phenoxyethanol is used as a perfume fixative; an insect repellent; an antiseptic; a solvent for cellulose acetate, dyes, inks, and resins; a preservative for pharmaceuticals, cosmetics and lubricants; an anesthetic in fish aquaculture; and in organic synthesis.

Phenoxyethanol is an alternative to formaldehyde-releasing preservatives. In Japan and the European Union, its concentration in cosmetics is restricted to 1%.

Production 
Phenoxyethanol is produced by the hydroxyethylation of phenol (Williamson synthesis), for example, in the presence of alkali-metal hydroxides or alkali-metal borohydrides.

Efficacy 
Phenoxyethanol is effective against gram-negative and gram-positive bacteria, and the yeast Candida albicans.

Safety 
Phenoxyethanol is a vaccine preservative and potential allergen, which may result in a nodular reaction at the site of injection.  Possible symptoms include rashes, eczema, and possible death. It reversibly inhibits NMDAR-mediated ion currents.

References

Primary alcohols
Glycol ethers
Household chemicals
Antiseptics
Phenol ethers